The Italian ambassador in Tel Aviv is the official representative of the Government in Rome to the Government of Israel.

List of representatives 
<onlyinclude>

References 

 
Israel
Italy